In the mathematical field known as complex analysis, Jensen's formula, introduced by , relates the average magnitude of an analytic function on a circle with the number of its zeros inside the circle. It forms an important statement in the study of entire functions.

The statement 

Suppose that ƒ is an analytic function in a region in the complex plane which contains the closed disk D of radius r about the origin, a1, a2, ..., an are the zeros of ƒ in the interior of D (repeated according to their respective multiplicity), and that ƒ(z) ≠ 0 for all D, as well as ƒ(0) ≠ 0. Jensen's formula states that

This formula establishes a connection between the moduli of the zeros of the function ƒ inside the disk D and the average of  log |f(z)| on the boundary circle |z| = r, and can be seen as a generalisation of the mean value property of harmonic functions. Namely, if f has no zeros in D, then Jensen's formula reduces to

which is the mean-value property of the harmonic function .

An equivalent statement of Jensen's formula that is frequently used is

Jensen's formula may be generalized for functions which are merely meromorphic on D. Namely, assume that 
 
where g and h are analytic functions in D having zeros at 
and 

respectively, then Jensen's formula for meromorphic functions states that

Jensen's formula can be used to estimate the number of zeros of analytic function in a circle.

Jensen's formula is an important statement in the study of value distribution of entire and meromorphic functions. In particular, it is the starting point of Nevanlinna theory.

Poisson–Jensen formula
Jensen's formula is a consequence of the more general Poisson–Jensen formula, which in turn follows from Jensen's formula by applying a Möbius transformation to z. It was introduced and named by Rolf Nevanlinna.   If f is a function which is analytic in the unit disk, with zeros  a1, a2, ..., an located in the interior of the unit disk, then for every  in the unit disk the Poisson–Jensen formula states that

Here,

is the Poisson kernel on the unit disk.
If the function f has no zeros in the unit disk, the Poisson-Jensen formula reduces to

which is the Poisson formula for the harmonic function .

References 
 
 
 

Theorems in complex analysis